Antonio García Robledo (born 6 March 1984) is a Spanish handball player who plays for BM Granollers and the Spanish national team.

References

1984 births
Living people
Spanish male handball players
Expatriate handball players
Spanish expatriate sportspeople in Hungary
SC Pick Szeged players
Spanish expatriate sportspeople in Romania
BM Granollers players
FC Barcelona Handbol players
Spanish expatriate sportspeople in France
Spanish expatriate sportspeople in Denmark
CB Ademar León players
Handball players from Catalonia
People from Vallès Oriental
Sportspeople from the Province of Barcelona
Liga ASOBAL players
Handball players at the 2020 Summer Olympics
Medalists at the 2020 Summer Olympics
Olympic bronze medalists for Spain
Olympic medalists in handball